Dasycephala may refer to:

 Attila, a genus of tropical birds
 Spermacoce, a genus of flowering plants